The 1919 Kendall Orange and Black football team represented Henry Kendall College, which was renamed the University of Tulsa on 1920, during the 1919 college football season. In their first year under head coach Francis Schmidt, the Orange and Black compiled an 8–0–1 record, won the Oklahoma Intercollegiate Conference championship, and outscored their opponents by a total of 591 to 27. Schmidt was later inducted into the College Football Hall of Fame.

Schedule

References

Kendall
Tulsa Golden Hurricane football seasons
College football undefeated seasons
Kendall Orange and Black football